(literally "Spew (Vomit) Norwegian Murder List") is a derogatory term meant to disparage Nynorsk, one of the two official standards of written Norwegian.

Background
 was first published in 1938; the eleventh edition came in 2012.

Learning to write both of the written standards of Norwegian, Nynorsk and Bokmål, is compulsory in Norwegian schools. Among student users of Bokmål in some areas, mockery of Nynorsk became widespread toward the end of the 20th century.

Significance
Anthropologist Thomas Hylland Eriksen, in his 1993 book  (Typical Norwegian), suggested "" as being among typical Norwegian cultural traits—meaning that the term has a certain connotation for many Norwegians.

The term has also been used in politics. He referred to the book as "'', as we used to call it". During debates in the city council of Oslo—a Bokmål stronghold—the term has also been used. Progress Party politician Anette Elseth spoke to limit compulsory school writing to one of the written standards only, and added that she and others used to change the name of the dictionary to "". In another debate, Conservative politician Øystein Sundelin claimed—rhetorically—that "regrettably, more than half" of the school attenders in Oslo have written "" on their dictionaries.

References

Nynorsk
Norwegian culture
Norwegian words and phrases
Norwegian language
Pejorative terms